Nothing But the Truth is a 1947 detective novel by John Rhode, the pen name of the British writer Cecil Street. It is the forty forth in his long-running series of novels featuring Lancelot Priestley, a Golden Age armchair detective.

In a contemporary review in The New York Times Isaac Anderson wrote, "The pattern is the same as in the other Dr. Priestley stories, and it is becoming more than a bit shopworn." However, Will Cuppy, writing in the New York Herald Tribune, was much more positive "Here is real detection in entertaining form, standard Grade A goods."

Synopsis
The wealthy Henry Watlington mysteriously disappears after an evening out, after his chauffeur is too drunk to drive him home, and shortly afterwards his body is found hidden in an AA Phone box by the side of the road. Jimmy Waghorn is assigned to the case and with clues from Priestley is able to crack the mystery.

References

Bibliography
 Evans, Curtis. Masters of the "Humdrum" Mystery: Cecil John Charles Street, Freeman Wills Crofts, Alfred Walter Stewart and the British Detective Novel, 1920-1961. McFarland, 2014.
 Herbert, Rosemary. Whodunit?: A Who's Who in Crime & Mystery Writing. Oxford University Press, 2003.
 Magill, Frank Northen . Critical Survey of Mystery and Detective Fiction: Authors, Volume 4. Salem Press, 1988.
 Reilly, John M. Twentieth Century Crime & Mystery Writers. Springer, 2015.

1947 British novels
Novels by Cecil Street
British crime novels
British mystery novels
British thriller novels
British detective novels
Geoffrey Bles books
Novels set in England